Shahab Moradi (born in Tehran), is an Iranian clergyman, preacher, and university lecturer. He has appeared in different programs on Islamic Republic of Iran Broadcasting as an expert since 2000.

Activities
Moradi is a social and climate change activist, and advocates for expanding green space by tree-planting and saving natural resources by promoting the scientific level of watershed management and, with students, annually planting trees in the outskirts of the city of Tehran on Arbor Day.

Moradi has given talks at various Iranian universities and religious sites such as Fatima Masumeh Shrine, Imam Reza Shrine, and Shah Cheragh, and has given international speeches.
He gave eulogies at the funerals of actor Khosrow Shakibaei, singer Morteza Pashaei, the environmentalist Mohammad Ali Inanloo, and the Iranian military officer Qasem Soleimani. He also delivered a speech following an earthquake in Kermanshah, Iran.

Shahab Moradi is the founder of a non-governmental charity named madar-e-mehraban (/mɒdær-e-mehræbɒn/; Persian: مادر مهربان), known as mmcharity to feed children in need.

References 

1972 births
Living people
People from Tehran